Richard A. Rembielak is an American college baseball coach, who most recently served as the head coach of the Akron Zips from the 2012 through the 2015 season.  As of the end of the 2014 season, his career head coaching record is 574–490–1.

Playing career
Rembielak played college baseball at Miami (OH) from 1979 to 1981.  He was drafted in the 1981 Major League Baseball Draft by the Baltimore Orioles and played five seasons of minor league baseball in the Orioles and Chicago Cubs organizations.

Coaching career
He served as the head baseball coach at Kent State of the Mid-American Conference (MAC) from 1994 to 2004, and he had a 373–251–1 (.597) record. This included a 200–100 (.667) record against MAC opponents. He won four regular season MAC championships and three MAC tournament titles. He was named the MAC Coach of the Year in 1996, 2000, and 2003.

Rembielak was the head coach of Wake Forest from 2005 to 2009.  In 2007, Rembielak's team finished second in the ACC Tournament, losing 1–0 to North Carolina in the championship game.  The team earned an at-large berth to the NCAA tournament.  At Wake, Rembielak posted a 95–81 record, including a 42–47 record in conference play.  Wake Forest replaced Rembielak with Tom Walter.

From 2010–2011, he was a volunteer assistant at Georgia Tech, after being let go by Wake Forest.

Prior to the start of the 2012 season, Rembielak was hired as the head coach at Akron. Following the conclusion of the 2015 season, Akron cancelled the baseball program.

In August 2015, Rembielak was hired to be the head coach at Perry High School in Massillon, Ohio.

Head coaching records
The following is a list of Rembielak's yearly records as an NCAA Division I head baseball coach.

References

External links
 Wake Forest profile

Year of birth missing (living people)
Living people
Akron Zips baseball coaches
Kent State Golden Flashes baseball coaches
Kent State University alumni
Miami RedHawks baseball players
Wake Forest Demon Deacons baseball coaches
University of Akron alumni
Bluefield Orioles players
Miami Marlins (FSL) players
Hagerstown Suns players
Winston-Salem Spirits players
Pittsfield Cubs players
Baseball players from Cleveland